Illeis is a genus of ladybird beetles in the family Coccinellidae. There are about five described species in Illeis, found in south and east Asia and in Oceania.

Species
These five species belong to the genus Illeis:
 Illeis cincta Fabricius, 1798
 Illeis confusa Timberlake, 1943
 Illeis galbula
 Illeis indica Timberlake, 1943
 Illeis koebelei Timberlake, 1943

References

Further reading

External links

 

Coccinellidae
Coccinellidae genera